Longriggend is a village in North Lanarkshire, Scotland, with a population of approximately 200. It is situated on moorland 8 km north-east of Airdrie, in the parish of New Monkland. It is roughly half way between Upperton and Caldercruix. The village appeared on a map by Timothy Pont, under the name of Langrodge. It was published in 1596 but the letters are difficult to read. The toponymy is listed along with other -rigg placenames. Longriggend is also shown on another map by Roy c1754. Slamannan Railway joined Longriggend with Airdrie and the Union Canal in 1840, but its gauge prevented its connection with the Edinburgh & Glasgow Railway. Coal pits in the area used the railway extensively, and by 1895 there was a station at Longriggend. By 1901 its population had reached over 1500, and it had a post and telegraph office, and an inn nearby.

The Ordnance Survey in 1867 also recorded a Roman Catholic school in the village.

Longriggend Fever Hospital and Remand Institution
Historically, there was a tuberculosis sanitorium in the part of the village now known as Upperton. The hospital was converted into Longriggend Remand Institution which has now been closed and demolished.

References

Villages in North Lanarkshire